Johnny Dynell (born John Savas) is a New York City DJ, record producer, recording artist, remixer, nightclub promoter, and nightlife impresario.

Club DJ
Dynell started his DJ career at the Mudd Club in 1980 and has been a resident DJ at influential New York City clubs for over three decades including The Pyramid Club, Danceteria, The Roxy, The Limelight, Area, The Tunnel, Susanne Bartsch parties, Jackie 60, Crobar, Mr. Black, Greenhouse, Marquee, The Copacabana, The Monster, The Ice Palace (Fire Island),  Daniel Nardicio parties and Club Cumming.

Nightlife promoter and club owner
In 1990 Dynell, along with others, founded the performance club Jackie 60, a center of New York art club performance. In 1996, Dynell and Valenti took over full-time operation of the venue that housed Jackie 60, renaming the club Mother. The venue, designed by Dynell, also housed Click + Drag, a “cyber-fetish-gothic weekly” and New York City's first weekly vampire themed club, Long Black Veil. Mother closed in June, 2000.

Music recording career
Johnny Dynell's first single "Jam Hot" (Acme Records, 1983) became a cult classic and has been remixed and sampled many times over. In 1990 Norman Cook aka Fatboy Slim and his group Beats International released "Dub Be Good to Me" which sampled the "Jam Hot" rap "tank fly boss walk jam nitty gritty/ you're listening to the boy from the big bad city, this is Jam Hot, this is Jam Hot". The song was the seventh best-selling single of 1990 in the UK, reached #1 on the U.S. Billboard Hot Dance Club Play chart and #76 on the Billboard Hot 100. In 2010 a remix project on Smash Hit Music included re-workings by Tensnake, Peter Rauhofer, Ilija Rudman, Clouded Vision, 40 Thieves and the song's original producer Mark Kamins.
As a recording artist Dynell has also been released on Atlantic Records, Arista Records, Epic Records, Heinz Records, Tribal Records, GIG Records, Xtravaganza Records, Pow Wow Records, Warlock Records and his own label Endless Night Music since 2011.

Dynell, a longtime member of the House of Xtravaganza, helped to introduce to the culture at large the "voguing" dance form with his 1989 release "Elements of Vogue", performed by MC David Ian Xtravaganza, a co-writer of the song with Dynell and David DePino.

As a songwriter, Dynell has also collaborated with Malcolm McLaren and Pink Martini on "Una Notte a Napoli" and "Segundo".

Selected discography

References

External links

 

Living people
American DJs
DJs from New York City
American record producers
Year of birth missing (living people)